David Stephen Rappaport (23 November 1951 – 2 May 1990) was an English actor with achondroplasia. He appeared in the films Time Bandits and The Bride, and television series L.A. Law, The Wizard and Captain Planet and the Planeteers. He was 3' 11" (1.19 m) in height.

Early life
Rappaport was born to Jewish taxi driver Mark and his wife Diana, née Schneiderman in London. He was born with achondroplasia, a common form of dwarfism. As a child, he developed talents in playing the accordion and drums, the latter of which he played professionally during his life. Rappaport studied psychology at the University of Bristol from 1970, graduating with a degree while developing his skills as a semi-professional drummer, and acting skills at the college dramatical society.

After six months in the United States, he returned to the United Kingdom to marry his college girlfriend, Jane. They had a son Joe, and Rappaport tried to settle down to family life as a teacher. But as his marriage broke down and he decided to follow a career as an actor, he became a resident of the squatter "nation" of Frestonia, acting as Foreign Minister under the name David Rappaport-Bramley – all inhabitants adopted the surname 'Bramley', so that if the Greater London Council were to succeed in an eviction, they would have to rehouse them as one family.

Career
David Rappaport first came to public notice in children's television, appearing alongside Sylvester McCoy as an O-Man in the 1979 BBC children's series Jigsaw. Rappaport and McCoy had previously appeared together in Illuminatus! at the Science Fiction Theatre of Liverpool (founded by Ken Campbell and Chris Langham in 1976). The two men also appeared in the anarchic Ken Campbell Road Show. Rappaport was with the Road Show in 1979 when it featured in the Secret Policeman's Ball. While McCoy appeared as an escapologist, Campbell introduced Rappaport to the audience as: "Not the smallest man in the world, but fucking close...". He appeared in some season one sketches of Not the Nine O'Clock News.

In the early 1980s Rappaport played the character of "Shades" on the anarchic Saturday morning kids TV shows Tiswas and The Saturday Show. One of Rappaport's most popular roles was as Randall, the leader of the gang of dwarves in the Terry Gilliam film Time Bandits in 1981. During the mid-80s, Rappaport played in the HTV production of Robin of Sherwood (released as Robin Hood in the US) with Jason Connery as Robin. The show was filmed in Bristol, where Rappaport had a home. During this time, he also made himself at home aboard Ki Longfellow-Stanshall and Vivian Stanshall's ship moored in the Bristol docks, the Old Profanity Showboat where he often appeared on stage. Rappaport appeared in 1985's The Bride as a circus dwarf who befriends Frankenstein's monster (played by  Clancy Brown). In 1986, Rappaport appeared on the 1985-1987 NBC TV Series Amazing Stories in an episode called "Gather Ye Acorns" (starring Mark Hamill of Star Wars fame). From 1986 to 1987, Rappaport played the lead role of Simon McKay in the CBS television series The Wizard. Rappaport also made guest appearances on such shows as The Goodies, The Young Ones, and L.A. Law. In LA Law, Rappaport played crack trial lawyer Hamilton Schuyler from Texas, in two episodes. Both episodes were significant roles, opposing Jimmy Smits. The second of these, The Mouse that Roared, was filmed only 6 months prior to his death. Rappaport was the voice of Dr. Blight's computer, MAL, on Captain Planet and the Planeteers; he was replaced by Tim Curry after his first four appearances due to his passing 4 months before the series aired. He also played Mr. Belvedere's cousin on an episode of Mr. Belvedere entitled "Duel" Season 5 Episode 6.

Final years, death and legacy
In 1987, Rappaport was best man at the wedding of Hazel O'Connor and artist Kurt Bippert, which took place on Venice Beach, California.

Rappaport struggled with depression later in his life. Just before his death, he had been cast and began filming for the role of Kivas Fajo in the Star Trek: The Next Generation episode "The Most Toys". During filming, Rappaport attempted suicide, and the scenes he had completed were later discarded when actor Saul Rubinek was hurriedly brought in by producers to replace him and complete the episode. The scenes of Rappaport as Kivas Fajo were included on the Season 3 Blu-ray Disc release of Star Trek: The Next Generation.

On 2 May 1990, he took his own life by shooting himself in the chest in Laurel Canyon Park in the San Fernando Valley in California.

Two of the creators of the US television series The Wizard, Michael Berk and Douglas Schwartz, went on to produce the lifeguard drama Baywatch. In this show's fifth season is an episode entitled "Short Sighted" which originally aired on 31 October 1994. Part of this episode concerns junior lifeguard Carter McKay (Nicholas Banko), whose father Simon McKay (Ed Gale) is a namesake tribute to Rappaport's character on The Wizard.

On stage
 Sleep Fast, They've Landed (Everybody Wants a Frozen Donkey for Christmas) (1971-1972) – Yellow
 Stonehenge Follies
 Illuminatus! (1975–1977) – Markoff Chaney
 Portland Bill Street Theatre
 The Immortalist - Reporter/Interviewer
 Interplay
 Volpone (1977) – Nano
 The Warp
 Little Brother Is Watching You (Small Is Beautiful) (1979) – himself
 Secret Policeman's Ball 1979 – as member of Ken Campbell Road Show
 Dr. Faustus (1980) – Beelzebub, Dick, Pope Adrian, and other characters
 Cinderella (1980)
 Exit The King (1983) – The Doctor
 Lulu (1985) – Schigolch

Filmography

References

External links
 
 
 Rappaport at shortsupport.org

1951 births
1990 deaths
Actors with dwarfism
Alumni of Bretton Hall College
Alumni of the University of Bristol
English expatriates in the United States
Jewish English male actors
Schoolteachers from London
20th-century squatters
Micronational leaders
Suicides by firearm in California
Male actors from London
20th-century English male actors
English drummers
1990 suicides